Thomas Alexander may refer to:

Thomas Alexander (military surgeon) (1812–1860), Scottish military surgeon, Director General of the Army Medical Department
Thomas C. Alexander (born 1956), American politician
Thomas Cecil Alexander (1884–1968), founder of the Scouting movement in Malaysia
Thomas G. Alexander (born 1935), American historian and academic
Thomas A. Alexander (1800–1866), American politician

See also
Tom Alexander (born 1934), of The Alexander Brothers